Longhua (龍華) were white, scarf-like collars worn by Manchu women in the early to mid-Qing dynasty. It was worn all year around when robes without collar were worn.

History 
Robes and jackets in the Qing dynasty were generally round-necked. Clothing with high collars or neckbands already existed since the late Ming dynasty, however, in Qing, high collar clothing were only worn on an occasional basis. Detachable collars were therefore produced and sold separately from the garments. They were then used for decorative purposes, for keeping its wearer warm and in formal official attire. During the late Qing, the high collar was eventually integrated to both the clothing of the Chinese and the Manchu as standard features. With the rise of collars in garments, longhua slowly disappeared in use.

Gallery

See also 

 Chaozhu (Court necklace)
 Mandarin collar
 Yunjian 
 Yupei

References

Qing clothing